Jerusalem Street can refer to one of the following streets:

 Aleje Jerozolimskie in Warsaw, Poland
 Sderot Yerushalayim in Jaffa, Israel